Aattukara Alamelu is a 1977 Indian Tamil-language film directed by R. Thyagarajan and produced by Sandow M. M. A. Chinnappa Thevar. The film stars Sivakumar and Sripriya. It was released on 10 November 1977 and became a silver jubilee hit. The film was remade in Telugu as Pottelu Punnamma and in Hindi as Mera Rakshak.

Plot 

Goatherd Alamelu leads a happy life with her pet goat in a village. Her life changes for the worse when a landlord talks ill of her character and claims to have had an affair with her.

Cast 
Sivakumar as Vijay
Sripriya as Alamelu
Jai Ganesh as Balu
Suruli Rajan as Velu
S. A. Ashokan as Dharmalingam
Kavitha as Radha
Major Sundarrajan as Aarumugam
Thengai Srinivasan as "Nattu Vaithiyar" Nallamuthu
Nagesh as Varadhachary
Jayamalini

Production 
The title Aattukara Alamelu was inspired by Mattukkara Velan (1970). Sivakumar said it took him "15 years to do the role in [Aattukara Alamelu]". The name of the title character, Alamelu, is a reference to Sripriya's birth name. Chinnappa Thevar wanted Nagesh to direct the film; he refused as he felt he was not the right person to do so.

Soundtrack 
The music for this film was composed by Shankar–Ganesh.

Release and reception 
Aattukara Alamelu was released on 10 November 1977, Diwali day. Film World wrote, "Aattukara Alamelu is a fluke; one misses any worthy element that is a box-office draw besides the performance of the goat!". The film was a silver jubilee hit.

Legacy 
Enga Ooru Aattukkaran (1990), which also stars Sripriya, was compared by N. Krishnaswamy of The Indian Express to Aattukara Alamelu as it also prominently features a goat.

References

External links 
 

1970s Tamil-language films
1977 films
Films scored by Shankar–Ganesh
Tamil films remade in other languages